Grace George (December 25, 1879 – May 19, 1961) was a prominent American stage actress, who had a long career on Broadway stage and also appeared in two films.

Biography
Grace George was born on December 25, 1879. She married producer William A. Brady, a widower, and was stepmother to his daughter, actress Alice Brady.

George starred as Esther in the hugely successful 1899 Broadway adaptation of Ben Hur from Lew Wallace's novel. George appeared in a silent film called Tainted Money in 1915. In 1935, she gave an acclaimed performance as Mary Herries in Edward Chodorov's thriller, Kind Lady, at the Booth Theatre.

She appeared in the film, Johnny Come Lately in 1943 with James Cagney. In 1950, she was awarded the Delia Austrian medal.

George died on May 19, 1961, aged 81, in New York City, having outlived both her son and her stepdaughter.

Personal life
George married William A. Brady, a widower, in 1899. She became stepmother to his daughter, future actress Alice Brady. Her own son, William A. Brady Jr., was born in 1900 and died on September 26, 1935 in Colts Neck, New Jersey. Brady Jr. married actress Katharine Alexander and had a daughter, Barbara Brady, who became an actress. 

Grace George's niece, Maude George, was a silent film character actor who appeared in a number of Erich von Stroheim films.

Filmography

References

External links

Grace George, NY Public Library Billy Rose Collection
Grace George; PeriodPaper.com c. 1910(WaybackMachine)
 portrait gallery(Univ. of Washington, Sayre collection)

1879 births
1961 deaths
19th-century American actresses
American stage actresses
20th-century American actresses
Actresses from New York City